Impastor is an American sitcom created by Christopher Vane. The series stars Michael Rosenbaum, who also serves as executive producer alongside Vane, Eric Tannenbaum and Kim Tannenbaum. Impastor premiered on July 15, 2015, on TV Land. The series was renewed for a second season which began airing on September 28, 2016.

On December 13, 2016, TV Land canceled the series after two seasons.

Plot
Impastor follows Buddy Dobbs (Michael Rosenbaum), a fugitive and hard-core gambling addict who, in order to hide from a pair of loan sharks, ends up stealing the identity of a recently deceased gay Lutheran pastor who was relocating to Ladner, a small-town community outside of Portland, Oregon. He hopes to keep up the ruse long enough to make the money necessary to flee Ladner, but he is inspired to stay after helping a mother and rebellious son as well as seeing how the townspeople get along peacefully. Over the series, Buddy tries to keep his true life from converging with his false life as various people from his past, plus two detectives who think he killed the pastor, come to town.

Cast

Main cast 
 Michael Rosenbaum as Buddy Dobbs, a slacker and gambling addict who faked his own death and is now posing as gay Lutheran pastor Jonathan Barlow to hide from loan sharks. Upon assuming this identity, Buddy asks the citizens of Ladner to informally address him as "Buddy," lying and stating that it is a nickname.
 Sara Rue as Dora Winston, Buddy's conservative, perpetually cheerful assistant. She hides her feelings, choosing to acquiesce to others, saying of herself, "My face says nothing about my feelings." She admits she is a pushover. Dora and Russell Kerry are former high school classmates.
 David Rasche as Alden Schmidt, president of Ladner Trinity Lutheran Church who often opposes Buddy's unconventional means of managing the congregation. He finds his marriage to his long-time wife has become "bland" and wishes to pursue a relationship with Ashlee, whom he finds out is a prostitute at the start of the second season.
 Mircea Monroe as Alexa Cummings, the beautiful and highly intelligent treasurer of Trinity Lutheran and owner of a local fashion boutique. She rivals Russell for Buddy's romantic attention. Over the series, is revealed that she was born Christina Burke. She was a teenaged runaway in Boston who hooked up with hardened criminal Kenny, inadvertently assisting him in a bank robbery twelve years earlier. She got a fresh start by changing her name from Christina Burke, married Kurt, an abusive alcoholic, whom she fled from four years before the series. She moves to Ladner for another fresh start, where she later murders a man, starts having sex with her pastor, then murders another man.
 Mike Kosinski as Russell Kerry, secretary of Ladner Trinity Lutheran Church. He is gay and rivals Alexa for Buddy's romantic attention. His parents are unaware that he is gay until Buddy inadvertently outs him in "Honor Thy Boyfriend's Mother and Father". Despite Russell's fears, his parents ultimately accept the revelation with minimal conflict and express their happiness when Russell pretends he and Buddy are in a monogamous relationship. His name is based on that of actress Keri Russell.

Recurring cast 
 Aimee Garcia as Leeane, a bartender and Buddy's ex-girlfriend. She believes he committed suicide. Though she admits at his memorial service that she loves Buddy, she believes that the pair are still not right for one another.
 Matthew Kevin Anderson and Jonathon Young as Detectives Lovello and Hyde, two officers investigating Buddy's disappearance and apparent suicide. They are unsuccessful in their dealings with Leeane; Lovello is more interested in flirting, and Hyde is tactless and unskilled as he is an officer through nepotism.
 Lindsey Gort as Ashlee, a prostitute hired by Buddy who later captures Alden's affection
 Hal Ozsan as Kenny Banderas, Alexa's ex-boyfriend described by Alexa as "violent" and "mentally unstable." He and Alexa met in Boston, and the two robbed a bank with Alexa acting as the getaway driver. Kenny was arrested and served twelve years in prison before receiving parole. He hoped Alexa would wait for him and feels betrayed she has not. In "Honor Thy Boyfriend's Mother and Father", he is shot and killed after pulling a gun on Buddy, who hides the body in a local lake. Though Kenny's body is found a week later, Buddy and Alexa convince the town that his death was a suicide.
 Bonita Friedericy as Hilva Schmidt, Alden's cold and overbearing wife
 Colin Lawrence as Damien, the loan shark from whom Buddy is trying to hide. He is shot and killed in the season 2 episode "Guardian Angel".
 Reynaldo Gallegos as Ray Florez, a longtime cellmate of Kenny Banderas. He is released from prison in season 2 and tracks down Alexa for the stolen money. He is shot and killed by Jasmine (after being set up by Buddy) in the season 2 episode "Sins of the Past-or Part 2".
 Mekia Cox as Jasmine, an associate of Damien's. She locates Buddy shortly after Damien's death, wanting to know what happened to her colleague.
 Adrian Holmes as Federal Agent Landecker
 Saidah Arrika Ekulona as Sheriff Rashida Graham

Development and production
On April 15, 2014, TV Land placed a cast-contingent pilot order on Impastor, with Christopher Vane attached to pen the script and executive produce alongside Eric Tannenbaum and Kim Tannenbaum via The Tannenbaum Company and CBS Television Studios.

Casting announcements began in June 2014, with Michael Rosenbaum first to be cast, in the role of Buddy Dobbs, the gambling, pot-smoking protagonist. Sara Rue was the next actor cast in the series regular role of Dora, a gossip and the assistant to the pastor. Shortly afterwards, Mircea Monroe and Aimee Garcia were cast in the series, with Monroe cast in the role of Alexa Cummings, the gorgeous treasurer who finds herself attracted to Buddy. Garcia was tapped to play the role of LeeAnne, Buddy's bartender ex-girlfriend, that he left behind. David Rasche then joined the series as Alden Schmidt, the church president who is suspicious of Buddy. Mike Kosinski was the last actor cast in the series regular role of Russell Kerry, the young secretary who is excited about the arrival of a gay pastor.

On October 1, 2014, TV Land placed a 10-episode series order on Impastor, which premiered on July 15, 2015. On August 31, 2015, TV Land renewed Impastor for a second season, which premiered on September 28, 2016. On December 13, 2016, one week after the second season ended, TV Land canceled the series.

Episodes

Series overview

Season 1 (2015)

Season 2 (2016)

Reception
Impastor has received a range of generally unfavorable to mixed reviews from critics. On Rotten Tomatoes the series has a rating of 33%, based on 18 reviews, with an average rating of 5.5/10. The site's critical consensus reads, "Impastor wastes a talented cast on a story that feels like one long, badly written joke straining for controversy without delivering a decent punchline." On Metacritic, the series has a score of 49 out of 100, based on 18 critics, indicating "mixed or average reviews".

References

External links

Impastor at TVGuide.com

2010s American LGBT-related comedy television series
2010s American single-camera sitcoms
2015 American television series debuts
2016 American television series endings
English-language television shows
TV Land original programming
Television shows set in Oregon
Christianity in fiction
Television series by CBS Studios
Religious comedy television series